Airas Nunes (c. 1230 – 1293) was a Galician cleric and troubador of the 13th century. He served under a bishop and much later, between 1284 and 1289, was a poet in the court of Sancho IV of Castille.

His songs are written in medieval Galician-Portuguese. Fourteen of his compositions are known, of which 6 are love songs (Cantigas de Amor), 3 songs of the friend (Cantigas de Amigo), 4 satires, and a pastoral song. At times quotations from other authors, such as King Denis of Portugal, King Alfonso X of Castile, João Zorro and Nuno Fernandes Torneol, are found in his work.

It is thought that he may have collaborated in the composition of the Cantigas de Santa Maria of Alfonso X the Wise.

References 
 Airas Nunes, in Cantigas Medievais Galego-Portuguesas

13th-century Galician-Portuguese troubadours
Year of birth uncertain
1293 deaths